Orchelimum erythrocephalum is a species of katydid known as the red-headed meadow katydid. It was described by William T. Davis in 1905.

References

erythrocephalum
Insects described in 1905